Save a Species Walk is an event in New South Wales in Australia focused on preservation of rare and endangered plants.

Each event includes nominating specific plants.

It involves a walk to raise money for seeds to be prepared and stored at the Australian PlantBank at the Australian Botanic Garden, Mount Annan.

Plants by year

The plants identified below are from the Royal Botanic Garden website

2014

 needle-leaved geebung Persoonia acerosa
 glandular pink-bell Tetratheca glandulosa
 Olearia cordata
 Zieria involucrata

2015

 thick leaf star hair Astrotricha crassifolia
 Budawangs cliff heath Budawangia gnidioides
 white flowered wax plant Cynanchum elegans
 buttercup doubletail orchid Diuris aequalis
 sparse heath Epacris sparsa
 Fletchers drumsticks Isopogon fletcheri
 Evans sedge Lepidosperma evansianum
 Woronora beard heath Leucopogon exolasius
 dwarf mountain pine Pherosphaera fitzgeraldii
 velvet zieria Zieria murphyi
 black hooded sun orchid Thelymitra atronitida
 villous mint bush Prostanthera densa
 Euphrasia bowdeniae
 Grevillea parviflora subsp. supplicans
 Hibbertia stricta subsp. furcatula

2016

 narrow-leaved bertya Bertya ingramii
 four-tailed grevillea Grevillea quadricauda
 bordered guinea flower Hibbertia marginata
 Dorrigo waratah Alloxylon pinnatum
 tall knotweed Persicaria elatior
 Moonee Quassia Quassia sp. Mooney Creek
 trailing monotoca Monotoca rotundifolia
 creeping hop-bush Dodonaea procumbens
 Suggan Buggan mallee Eucalyptus saxatilis
 Bega wattle Acacia georgensis
 musty leek orchid Prasophyllum pallens

Notes

Events in New South Wales
Plant conservation